Gashanle is a town in the Middle Shabelle (Shabeellaha Dhexe) region of Somalia. It is located in the southeastern part of the country.

References
Gashanle

Populated places in Middle Shabelle